China National Highway 321 (G321) runs northwest from Guangzhou, Guangdong towards Guangxi Province, Guizhou Province, and ends in Chengdu, Sichuan Province. It is 2,220 kilometres in length.

Route and distance

See also 

 China National Highways

Transport in Guangdong
Transport in Guangxi
Transport in Guizhou
Transport in Sichuan
321